"Irgendwas" is a song by German recording artist Yvonne Catterfeld, recorded along with Bengio for her seventh studio album Guten Morgen Freiheit (2017). Selected as the album's first single, it was released as a digital download on 9 December 2016. It debuted and peaked at number 27 on the German Singles Chart, becoming her highest-charting lead single since 2006's "Erinner mich, dich zu vergessen".

Track listing

Charts

References

2016 singles
2016 songs
Yvonne Catterfeld songs